A list of Undergraduate and Alumni Chapters of the Sigma Tau Gamma Fraternity.

Undergraduate Chapters (Active/Inactive/Associate)

Future Expansions

Alumni Associations

Alumni Chapters

External links
 Sigma Tau Gamma Website

References

chapters
Lists of chapters of United States student societies by society